Leslie Barton (20 March 1920 – July quarter 2002) was an English professional footballer who played as a full-back. He started his career with Bolton Wanderers, but failed to break into the first team and moved to Football League Third Division North side New Brighton in 1949. Barton spent two years at New Brighton, where he scored one goal in 64 league appearances, before moving to Northern Ireland for a spell with Linfield.

See also
Football in England
List of football clubs in England

References

1920 births
2002 deaths
Footballers from Rochdale
Association football defenders
Bolton Wanderers F.C. players
New Brighton A.F.C. players
Linfield F.C. players
English Football League players
English footballers